The 1998–99 season was the 53rd season in Rijeka's history. It was their 8th season in the Prva HNL and 25th successive top tier season.

Competitions

Prva HNL

First stage

Second stage (championship play-off)

Results summary

Results by round

Matches

Prva HNL

Source: HRnogomet.com

Croatian Cup

Source: HRnogomet.com

Squad statistics
Competitive matches only.  Appearances in brackets indicate numbers of times the player came on as a substitute.

See also
1998–99 Prva HNL
1998–99 Croatian Cup

References

External links
 1998–99 Prva HNL at HRnogomet.com
 1998–99 Croatian Cup at HRnogomet.com 
 Prvenstvo 1998.-99. at nk-rijeka.hr

HNK Rijeka seasons
Rijeka